Grace Academy is an Academy in Darlaston, Walsall, England. It is a non-selective co-educational secondary school.

It was formerly Darlaston Community Science College which had been placed into special measures by OFSTED in January 2008 and failed to raise standards in the allotted time. As a result, it was converted into an Academy on 1 September 2009 using the same buildings.

A new, purpose-built academy building was opened in September 2013, and the previous school buildings demolished to make way for astroturf sports facilities for the new school site.

The academy was formerly operated by Grace Foundation incorporated by Lord Edmiston – entrepreneur of International Motors Ltd and founder of the evangelical charity Christian Vision, then became part of Tove Learning Trust on 1 April 2019 headed by CEO Dr Jamie Clarke.

Carl Salt was appointed Principal in April 2016 and led the academy to achieve an OFSTED rating of Good in April 2017 implementing significant improvements in teaching, progress and student achievement.

The academy is now headed by Julie Anstey, Associated Principal while Carl Salt is Director of Education over the three Grace Academy schools.

Recent results and OFSTED inspections

2017
Grace Academy Darlaston was rated as Good during its April 2017 OFSTED inspection, with Principal Carl Salt.

2018
Grace Academy Darlaston has achieved positive Progress 8 scores since the measure was formerly introduced and is currently rated fourth in the Walsall area.

2019
Grace Academy Darlaston is now led by Associate Principal Julie Anstey, Carl Salt is now Director of Education within the Grace Academy sector of Tove Learning Trust.

Notable alumni

Darlaston Comprehensive/Community Science College
 Mark Rhodes, singer and television presenter

See also
 Grace Academy (Solihull)
 Grace Academy (Coventry)
 List of schools in Walsall

References 

Academies in Walsall
Secondary schools in Walsall